Baseball is a baseball video game released for the RCA Studio II by RCA in 1977.

References

1977 video games
Baseball video games
Video games developed in the United States
RCA Studio II games